Garscadden (Gaelic: Gart Sgadan) is a district in the Scottish city of Glasgow. It is situated north of the River Clyde. It lies between Yoker to the west, Scotstoun to the east and Knightswood to the north. It has a train station close to Knightswood shopping centre and Yoker Railway Depot.

Garscadden railway station is on the Argyle Line.

Notes

Areas of Glasgow